Mezhgoran is a community in the Gjirokastër County, southern Albania. At the 2015 local government reform it became part of the Tepelenë municipality.

References

Populated places in Tepelenë
Villages in Gjirokastër County